An acceptability judgment task, also called acceptability rating task, is a common method in empirical linguistics to gather information about the internal grammar of speakers of a language.

Acceptability and grammaticality
The goal of acceptability rating studies is to gather insights into the mental grammars of participants. As the grammaticality of a linguistic construction is an abstract construct that cannot be accessed directly, this type of tasks is usually not called grammaticality, but acceptability judgment. This can be compared to intelligence. Intelligence is an abstract construct that cannot be measured directly. What can be measured are the outcomes of specific test items. The result of one item, however, is not very telling. Instead, IQ tests consist of several items building a score. Similarly, in acceptability rating studies, grammatical constructions are measured through several items, i.e., sentences to be rated. This is also done to ensure that participants do not rate the meaning of a particular sentence.

The difference between acceptability and grammaticality is linked to the distinction between performance and competence in generative grammar.

Types
Several different types of acceptability rating tasks are used in linguistics. The most common tasks use Likert scales. Forced choice and yes-no rating tasks are also common. Besides these classical test types, there are other, methods like thermometer judgments or magnitude estimation which have been argued to be more difficult to process for participants, however.

Further reading
Bross, F. (2019): Acceptability Ratings in Linguistics: A Practical Guide to Grammaticality Judgments, Data Collection, and Statistical Analysis. Version 1.0. Mimeo.
Myers, J. (2009): Syntactic Judgment Experiments. In: Language and Linguistics Compass, 3(1), 406-423.
Podesva, R. J. & Sharma, D. (eds.) (2013): Research Methods in Linguistics. Cambridge: Cambridge University Press.
Schütze, C. T. (2016): The Empirical Base of Linguistics. Grammaticality Judgments and Linguistic Methodology. Berlin: Language Science Press.
Sprouse, J. & Almeida, D. (2017): Design sensitivity and statistical power in acceptability judgment experiments. In: Glossa. A Journal of General Linguistics, 2(1), 1-32.
Sprouse, J., Schütze, C. T. & Almeida, D. (2013): A comparison of informal and formal acceptability judgments using a random sample from Linguistic Inquiry 2001-2010. In: Lingua, 134, 219-248.

References

Psycholinguistics
Quantitative linguistics
Linguistic research